Federico Rauch (né Friedrich Rauch) (Weinheim, Electoral Palatinate, 1790 – Las Vizcacheras, Argentina, 1829) was a German-born colonel of Argentina. He died in the Battle of Vizcacheras.

1786 births
1829 deaths
People from Weinheim
German emigrants to Argentina
Argentine colonels
Unitarianists (Argentina)
Argentine military personnel killed in the Argentine Civil War